Hymenoxys bigelovii is a species of flowering plant in the daisy family known by the common name Bigelow's rubberweed . It is native to the states of Arizona, Utah, and New Mexico in the southwestern United States.

Leaves have very narrow lobes resembling branching threads. One plant will generally produce 1-5 flower heads, each head with 13–15 ray flowers and 100–250 disc flowers.

References

External links
Photo of herbarium specimen at Missouri Botanical Garden, collected in Arizona in 1922

bigelovii
Flora of Arizona
Flora of Utah
Flora of New Mexico
Plants described in 1853
Flora without expected TNC conservation status